The CANT 6 was a flying boat designed for Italian military service in 1925. It was a large biplane of conventional design with three engines mounted in nacelles within the interplane gap. Only a single example was produced in its original military configuration, followed by two further aircraft redesigned as 11-seat passenger aircraft. One of these was retained by CANT, but the other entered airline service with Società Italiana Servizi Aerei.

Variants
 CANT 6 : Three-engine bomber aircraft. One built.
 CANT 6ter : 11-seat passenger transport aircraft. Two built.

Operators

 Società Italiana Servizi Aerei (S.I.S.A.)

Specifications (6ter)

See also

References

 
 aerei-italiani.net

cant 06
1920s Italian patrol aircraft
Flying boats
Trimotors
Biplanes
Aircraft first flown in 1925